Kuiper is a Dutch occupational surname meaning cooper. Common spelling variants include Kuyper, Kuipers, Kuijper, Kuijpers, Kuypers, and De Kuyper. Notable people with the name include:

Kuiper
Adrian Kuiper (born 1959), South African cricketer
Barend Klaas Kuiper (1877–1961), Dutch-American historian
David Kuiper (born 1980), Dutch rower
Duane Kuiper (born 1950), American baseball player
Edith Kuiper (born 1960), Dutch economist
Franciscus Bernardus Jacobus Kuiper (1907–2003), Dutch Indologist
Gerard Kuiper (1905–1973), Dutch-American astronomer after whom the Kuiper belt was named
Glen Kuiper (born 1963) American broadcaster
Hennie Kuiper (born 1949), Dutch cyclist
J. P. Kuiper (1922–1985), Dutch professor of social medicine
Michael Kuiper (born 1989), Dutch martial artist
Nick Kuiper (born 1982), Canadian ice hockey player
Nicky Kuiper (born 1989), Dutch footballer
Nicolaas Kuiper (1920–1994), Dutch mathematician, known for Kuiper's test, Kuiper's theorem, and the Eells–Kuiper manifold
Peter Kuiper (1929–2007), Dutch-German actor
Piet Kuiper (born 1934), Dutch botanist
Rienk Kuiper (1886–1966), Frisian-Dutch president of Calvin College
Roel Kuiper (born 1962), Dutch historian, philosopher and politician
Taco Kuiper (1941–2004), South African publisher and journalist

Kuyper
Abraham Kuyper (1837–1920), Dutch prime minister, theologian, and founder of a Protestant church
Elisabeth Kuyper (1877–1953), Dutch Romantic composer and conductor
Frans Kuyper (1629–1691), Dutch Socinian writer and printer
Jacques Kuyper (1761–1808), Dutch draftsman and composer

See also
Kuyper College

Dutch-language surnames
Afrikaans-language surnames
Occupational surnames

de:Kuiper
es:Kuiper
fr:Kuiper
it:Kuiper
nl:Kuiper